The International League Most Valuable Player Award (MVP) is an annual award given to the best player in Minor League Baseball's International League based on their regular-season performance as voted on by league managers. Broadcasters, Minor League Baseball executives, members of the media, coaches, and other representatives from the league's clubs have previously voted as well. Though the circuit was founded in 1884, it did not become known as the International League on a consistent basis until 1912. The first Most Valuable Player Award was not issued until 1932. After the cancellation of the 2020 season, the league was known as the Triple-A East in 2021 before reverting to the International League name in 2022.

Twenty-eight outfielders have won the MVP Award, the most of any position. First basemen, with 27 winners, have won the most among infielders, followed by third basemen (14), shortstops (10), and second basemen (5). Five catchers and four pitchers have won the award.

Seventeen players who have won the MVP Award also won the International League Top MLB Prospect Award (formerly the Rookie of the Year Award) in the same season: Don Buford (1963), Joe Foy (1965), Mike Epstein (1966), Merv Rettenmund (1968), Luis Alvarado (1969), Roger Freed (1970), Jim Rice (1974), Mike Vail (1975), Rich Dauer (1976), Scott Bradley (1984), Dan Pasqua (1985), Randy Milligan (1987), J. T. Snow (1992), Chris Colabello (2013), Steven Souza Jr. (2014), Rhys Hoskins (2017), and Joey Meneses (2018). From 1932 to 1952, pitchers were eligible to win the MVP Award as no award was designated for pitchers. In 1953, the International League established a Pitcher of the Year Award (formerly the Most Valuable Pitcher Award). Two players have won the MVP Award on multiple occasions. Rocky Nelson, who was the MVP for 1953, 1955, and 1958, has the most wins. Roberto Petagine won back-to-back in 1997 and 1998.

Twelve players from the Rochester Red Wings have been selected for the MVP Award, more than any other team in the league, followed by the original Buffalo Bisons and Columbus Clippers (8); the Norfolk Tides, Pawtucket Red Sox, and Toronto Maple Leafs (7); the Durham Bulls and Syracuse Mets (6); the Baltimore Orioles, Montreal Royals, and Toledo Mud Hens (5); the Newark Bears and Scranton/Wilkes-Barre RailRiders (3); the Buffalo Bisons, Indianapolis Indians, Jacksonville Jumbo Shrimp, Lehigh Valley IronPigs, Louisville Colonels, and Richmond Braves (2); and the Charlotte Knights, Columbus Jets, and Louisville Bats (1).

Fourteen players from the New York Yankees Major League Baseball (MLB) organization have won the award, more than any other, followed by the Boston Red Sox organization (10); the Baltimore Orioles organization (9); the Cleveland Guardians organization (8); the New York Mets and Tampa Bay Rays organizations (6); the Cincinnati Reds, Detroit Tigers, Los Angeles Dodgers, and Philadelphia Phillies organizations (5); the St. Louis Cardinals organizations (4); the Toronto Blue Jays organization (3); the Atlanta Braves and Minnesota Twins organizations (2); and the Chicago White Sox, Oakland Athletics, Pittsburgh Pirates, and Washington Nationals organizations (1). Eight award winners played for teams that were not affiliated with any MLB organization.

Winners

Wins by team

Active International League teams appear in bold.

Wins by organization

Active International League–Major League Baseball affiliations appear in bold.

See also
Major League Baseball Most Valuable Player Award
Pacific Coast League Most Valuable Player Award

Notes

References
Specific

General

 
Awards established in 1932